Banff National Park is Canada's oldest national park, established in 1885 as Rocky Mountains Park. The Icefields Parkway extends from Lake Louise, connecting to Jasper National Park in the north. Provincial forests and Yoho National Park are neighbours to the west, while Kootenay National Park is located to the south and Kananaskis Country to the southeast. The main commercial centre of the park is the town of Banff, in the Bow River valley.

The Canadian Pacific Railway was instrumental in Banff's early years, building the Banff Springs Hotel and Chateau Lake Louise, and attracting tourists through extensive advertising. In the early 20th century, roads were built in Banff, at times by war internees from World War I, and through Great Depression-era public works projects. Since the 1960s, park accommodations have been open all year, with annual tourism visits to Banff increasing to over 5 million in the 1990s. Millions more pass through the park on the Trans-Canada Highway. As Banff has over three million visitors annually, the health of its ecosystem has been threatened. In the mid-1990s, Parks Canada responded by initiating a two-year study which resulted in management recommendations and new policies that aim to preserve ecological integrity.

Banff National Park has a subarctic climate with three ecoregions, including montane, subalpine, and alpine. The forests are dominated by Lodgepole pine at lower elevations and Engelmann spruce in higher ones below the treeline, above which is primarily rocks and ice. Mammal species such as the grizzly bear, cougar, wolverine, elk, bighorn sheep and moose are found, along with hundreds of bird species. Reptiles and amphibians are also found but only a limited number of species have been recorded. The mountains are formed from sedimentary rocks which were pushed east over newer rock strata, between 80 and 55 million years ago. Over the past few million years, glaciers have at times covered most of the park, but today are found only on the mountain slopes though they include the Columbia Icefield, the largest uninterrupted glacial mass in the Rockies. Erosion from water and ice have carved the mountains into their current shapes.

History 

Throughout its history, Banff National Park has been shaped by tension between conservationist and land exploitation interests. The park was established on November 25, 1885, as Banff Hot Springs Reserve, in response to conflicting claims over who discovered hot springs there and who had the right to develop the hot springs for commercial interests. The conservationists prevailed when Prime Minister John A. Macdonald set aside the hot springs as a small protected reserve, which was later expanded to include Lake Louise and other areas extending north to the Columbia Icefield.

Indigenous peoples  
Archaeological evidence found at Vermilion Lakes indicates the first human activity in Banff to 10,300 B.P. Prior to European contact, the area that is now Banff National Park was home to many Indigenous Peoples, including the Stoney Nakoda, Ktunaxa, Tsuut'ina, Kainaiwa, Piikani, Siksika, and Plains Cree . Indigenous Peoples utilized the area to hunt, fish, trade, travel, survey and practice culture. Many areas within Banff National Park are still known by their Stoney Nakoda names such as Lake Minnewanka and the Waputik Range. Cave and Basin served as an important cultural and spiritual site for the Stoney Nakoda.

With the admission of British Columbia to Canada on July 20, 1871, Canada agreed to build a transcontinental railroad. Construction of the railroad began in 1875, with Kicking Horse Pass chosen, over the more northerly Yellowhead Pass, as the route through the Canadian Rockies. Ten years later, on November 7, 1885, the last spike was driven in Craigellachie, British Columbia.

Rocky Mountains Park established 
With conflicting claims over the discovery of hot springs in Banff, Prime Minister John A. Macdonald decided to set aside a small reserve of  around the hot springs at Cave and Basin as a public park known as the Banff Hot Springs Reserve in 1885. This was Canada's first national park, and the third established in North America, after Yellowstone and Mackinac National Parks. The Canadian Pacific Railway built the Banff Springs Hotel and Lake Louise Chalet to attract tourists and increase the number of rail passengers.

The Stoney Nakoda First Nation were removed from Banff National Park between the years 1890 and 1920. The park was designed to appeal to sportsmen, and tourists. The exclusionary policy met the goals of sports hunting, tourism, and game conservation, as well as of those attempting to "civilize" the First Nations of the area.

Early on, Banff was popular with wealthy European and American tourists, the former of which arrived in Canada via trans-Atlantic luxury liner and continued westward on the railroad. Some visitors participated in mountaineering activities, often hiring local guides. Guides Jim and Bill Brewster founded one of the first outfitters in Banff. From 1906, the Alpine Club of Canada organized climbs, hikes and camps in the park.

By 1911, Banff was accessible by automobile from Calgary. Beginning in 1916, the Brewsters offered motorcoach tours of Banff. In 1920, access to Lake Louise by road was available, and the Banff-Windermere Road opened in 1923 to connect Banff with British Columbia.

In 1902, the park was expanded to cover , encompassing areas around Lake Louise, and the Bow, Red Deer, Kananaskis, and Spray rivers. The Act, which took effect May 30, 1930, also renamed the park Banff National Park, named for the Canadian Pacific Railway station, which in turn was named after the Banffshire region in Scotland. With the construction of a new east gate in 1933, Alberta transferred  to the park.

Coal mining 
In 1877, the First Nations of the area signed Treaty 7, which gave Canada rights to explore the land for resources. At the beginning of the 20th century, coal was mined near Lake Minnewanka in Banff. For a brief period, a mine operated at Anthracite but was shut down in 1904. The Bankhead mine, at Cascade Mountain, was operated by the Canadian Pacific Railway from 1903 to 1922. In 1926, the town was dismantled, with many buildings moved to the town of Banff and elsewhere.

Internment and work camps 
During World War I, immigrants from Austria, Hungary, Germany and Ukraine were sent to Banff to work in internment camps. The main camp was located at Castle Mountain, and was moved to Cave and Basin during winter. Much early infrastructure and road construction was done by men of various Slavic origins although Ukrainians constituted a majority of those held in Banff. Historical plaques and a statue erected by the Ukrainian Canadian Civil Liberties Association commemorate those interned at Castle Mountain, and at Cave and Basin National Historic Site where an interpretive pavilion dealing with Canada's first national internment operations opened in September 2013.

In 1931, the Government of Canada enacted the Unemployment and Farm Relief Act which provided public works projects in the national parks during the Great Depression. In Banff, workers constructed a new bathhouse and pool at Upper Hot Springs, to supplement Cave and Basin. Other projects involved road building in the park, tasks around the Banff townsite and construction of a highway connecting Banff and Jasper. In 1934, the Public Works Construction Act was passed, providing continued funding for the public works projects. New projects included construction of a new registration facility at Banff's east gate and construction of an administrative building in Banff. By 1940, the Icefields Parkway reached the Columbia Icefield area of Banff and connected Banff and Jasper. Most of the infrastructure present in the national park dates from public work projects enacted during the Great Depression.

Alternative service camps for conscientious objectors were set up in Banff during World War II, with camps located at Lake Louise, Stoney Creek, and Healy Creek. These camps were largely populated by Mennonites from Saskatchewan.

Winter tourism 
Winter tourism in Banff began in February 1917, with the first Banff Winter Carnival. It was marketed to a regional middle class audience, and became the centerpiece of local boosters aiming to attract visitors, which were a low priority for the Canadian Pacific Railway (CPR). The carnival featured a large ice palace, which in 1917 was built by World War I internees. Carnival events included cross-country skiing, ski jumping, curling, snowshoe, and skijoring. In the 1930s, the first downhill ski resort, Sunshine Village, was developed by the Brewsters. Mount Norquay ski area was also developed during the 1930s, with the first chair lift installed there in 1948.

Since 1968, when the Banff Springs Hotel was winterized, Banff has been a year-round destination. In the 1950s, the Trans-Canada Highway was constructed, providing another transportation corridor through the Bow Valley, making the park more accessible.

Canada launched several bids to host the Winter Olympics in Banff, with the first bid for the 1964 Winter Olympics, which were eventually awarded to Innsbruck, Austria. Canada narrowly lost a second bid, for the 1968 Winter Olympics, which were awarded to Grenoble, France. Once again, Banff launched a bid to host the 1972 Winter Olympics, with plans to hold the Olympics at Lake Louise. The 1972 bid was controversial, as environmental lobby groups strongly opposed the bid, which had sponsorship from Imperial Oil. Bowing to pressure, Jean Chrétien, then the Minister of Environment, the government department responsible for Parks Canada, withdrew support for the bid, which was eventually lost to Sapporo, Japan. When nearby Calgary hosted the 1988 Winter Olympics, the cross-country ski events were held at the Canmore Nordic Centre Provincial Park at Canmore, Alberta, located just outside the eastern gates of Banff National Park on the Trans-Canada Highway.

Conservation 
Since the original Rocky Mountains Park Act, subsequent acts and policies placed greater emphasis on conservation. With public sentiment tending towards environmentalism, Parks Canada issued major new policy in 1979, which emphasized conservation. The National Parks Act was amended in 1988, which made preserving ecological integrity the first priority in all park management decisions. The Act also required each park to produce a management plan, with greater public participation.

In 1984, Banff was declared a UNESCO World Heritage Site, Canadian Rocky Mountain Parks World Heritage Site, together with the other national and provincial parks that form the Canadian Rocky Mountain Parks, for the mountain landscapes containing mountain peaks, glaciers, lakes, waterfalls, canyons and limestone caves as well as fossil beds. With this designation came added obligations for conservation.

During the 1980s, Parks Canada moved to privatize many park services such as golf courses, and added user fees for use of other facilities and services to help deal with budget cuts. In 1990, the town of Banff was incorporated, giving local residents more say regarding any proposed developments.

In the 1990s, development plans for the park, including expansion at Sunshine Village, were under fire with lawsuits filed by Canadian Parks and Wilderness Society (CPAWS). In the mid-1990s, the Banff-Bow Valley Study was initiated to find ways to better address environmental concerns, and issues relating to development in the park.

Geography 

Banff National Park is located in the Rocky Mountains on Alberta's western border with British Columbia in the Alberta Mountain forests ecoregion. Jasper National Park borders Banff National Park to the north, while Yoho National Park is to the west and Kootenay National Park is to the south. Kananaskis Country, which includes Bow Valley Wildland Provincial Park, Spray Valley Provincial Park, and Peter Lougheed Provincial Park, is located to the south and east of Banff.
The Trans-Canada Highway passes through Banff National Park, from the eastern boundary near Canmore, through the towns of Banff and Lake Louise, and into Yoho National Park in British Columbia. The Banff townsite is the main commercial centre in the national park. The village of Lake Louise is located at the junction of the Trans-Canada Highway and the Icefields Parkway, which extends north to the Jasper townsite.

Banff 

Banff, established in 1885, is the main commercial centre in Banff National Park, as well as a centre for cultural activities. Banff is home to several cultural institutions, including the Banff Centre, the Whyte Museum, the Buffalo Nations Luxton Museum, Cave and Basin National Historic Site, and several art galleries. Throughout its history, Banff has hosted many annual events, including Banff Indian Days which began in 1889, and the Banff Winter Carnival. Since 1976, The Banff Centre has organized the Banff Mountain Film Festival. In 1990, Banff incorporated as a town of Alberta, though still subject to the National Parks Act and federal authority in regards to planning and development. In its 2014 census, the town of Banff had a permanent population of 8,421 as well as 965 non-permanent residents for a total population of 9,386. The Bow River flows through the town of Banff, with the Bow Falls located on the outskirts of town.

Lake Louise 

Located  from Lake Louise, Moraine Lake provides a scenic vista of the Valley of the Ten Peaks. This scene was pictured on the back of the $20 Canadian banknote, in the 1969–1979 ("Scenes of Canada") series. The Lake Louise Mountain Resort is also located near the village. Lake Louise is one of the most visited lakes in the world and is framed to the southwest by the Mount Victoria Glacier.

Icefields Parkway 

The Icefields Parkway is a  road connecting Lake Louise to Jasper, Alberta. The Parkway originates at Lake Louise, and extends north up the Bow Valley, past Hector Lake, which is the largest natural lake in the park. Other scenic lakes near the parkway include Bow Lake, and Peyto Lakes, both north of Hector Lake. The Parkway then crosses Bow Summit, and follows the Mistaya River to Saskatchewan Crossing, where it converges with the Howse and North Saskatchewan River. Bow Summit is the highest elevation crossed by a public road in Canada.

The North Saskatchewan River flows east from Saskatchewan Crossing, out of Banff, into what is known as David Thompson Country, and onto Edmonton. The David Thompson Highway follows the North Saskatchewan River, past the man-made Abraham Lake, and through David Thompson Country.

North of Saskatchewan Crossing, the Icefields Parkway follows the North Saskatchewan River up to the Columbia Icefield.

Geology 

The Canadian Rockies consist of several northwest–southeast trending ranges. Two main mountain ranges are within the park, each consisting of numerous subranges. The western border of the park follows the crest of the Main Ranges (also known as the Park Ranges), which is also the continental divide. The Main Ranges in Banff National Park include from north to south, the Waputik, Bow and Blue Ranges. The high peaks west of Lake Louise are part of the Bow Range. The eastern border of the park includes all of the Front Ranges consisting of from north to south, the Palliser, Sawback and Sundance Ranges. The Banff townsite is located in the Front Ranges. Just outside of the park to the east lie the foothills that extend from Canmore at the eastern entrance of the park eastward into the Great Plains. Well west of the park, the Western Ranges of the Rockies pass through Yoho and Kootenay National Parks.

The Canadian Rockies are composed of sedimentary rock, including shale, sandstone, dolomite and limestone. The vast majority of geologic formations in Banff range in age from Precambrian to the Jurassic periods (600–145 m.y.a.). However, rocks as young as the lower Cretaceous (145–66 m.y.a.) can be found near the east entrance and on Cascade Mountain above the Banff townsite. These sedimentary rocks formed at the bottom of shallow seas between 600 and 175 m.y.a. and were pushed east during the Laramide orogeny. Mountain building in Banff National Park ended approximately 55 m.y.a.

The Canadian Rockies may have risen up to  approximately 70 m.y.a. Once mountain formation ceased, erosion carved the mountains into their present rugged shape. The erosion was first due to water, then was greatly accelerated by the Quaternary glaciation 2.5 million years ago. Glacial landforms dominate Banff's geomorphology, with examples of all classic glacial forms, including cirques, arêtes, hanging valleys, moraines, and U-shaped valleys. The pre-existing structure left over from mountain-building strongly guided glacial erosion: mountains in Banff include complex, irregular, anticlinal, synclinal, castellate, dogtooth, and sawback mountains.

Many of the mountain ranges trend northwest to southeast, with sedimentary layering dipping down to the west at 40–60 degrees. This leads to dip slope landforms, with generally steeper east and north faces, and trellis drainage, where rivers and old glacial valleys followed the weaker layers in the rocks as they were relatively easily weathered and eroded.
Classic examples are found at the Banff townsite proper: Mount Rundle is a classic dip slope mountain. Just to the north of the Banff townsite, Castle Mountain is composed of numerous Cambrian age rock formations. The uppermost section of the peak consists of relatively harder dolomite from the Eldon Formation. Below that lies the less dense shales of the Stephen Formation and the lowest exposed cliffs are limestones of the Cathedral Formation. Dogtooth mountains, such as Mount Louis, exhibit sharp, jagged slopes. The Sawback Range, which consists of nearly vertical dipping sedimentary layers, has been eroded by cross gullies. The erosion of these almost vertical layers of rock strata in the Sawback Range has resulted in formations that appear like the teeth on a saw blade. Erosion and deposition of higher elevation rock layers has resulted in scree deposits at the lowest elevations of many of the mountains.

Glaciers and icefields 

Banff National Park has numerous large glaciers and icefields, 100 of which can be observed from the Icefields Parkway. Small cirque glaciers are fairly common in the Main Ranges, situated in depressions on the side of many mountains. As with the majority of mountain glaciers around the world, the glaciers in Banff are retreating. While Peyto Glacier is one of the longest continuously studied glaciers in the world, with research extending back to the 1970s, most of the glaciers of the Canadian Rockies have only been scientifically evaluated since the late 1990s. Glaciologists are now researching the glaciers in the park more thoroughly, and have been analyzing the impact that reduced glacier ice may have on water supplies to streams and rivers. Estimates are that 150 glaciers disappeared in the Canadian Rockies (areas both inside and outside Banff National Park) between the years 1920 and 1985. Another 150 glaciers disappeared between 1985 and 2005, indicating that the retreat and disappearance of glaciers is accelerating. In Banff National Park alone, in 1985 there were 365 glaciers but by 2005, 29 glaciers had disappeared.

The largest glaciated areas include the Waputik and Wapta Icefields, which both lie on the Banff-Yoho National Park border. Outlets of Wapta Icefield on the Banff side of the continental divide include Peyto, Bow, and Vulture Glaciers. Bow Glacier retreated an estimated  between the years 1850 and 1953, and since that period, there has been further retreat which has left a newly formed lake at the terminal moraine. Peyto Glacier has lost 70 percent of its volume since record keeping began and has retreated approximately  since 1880; the glacier is at risk of disappearing entirely within the next 30 to 40 years.

The Columbia Icefield, at the northern end of Banff, straddles the Banff and Jasper National Park border and extends into British Columbia. Snow Dome, in the Columbia Icefield is a hydrological apex of North America, with water flowing via outlet glaciers to the Atlantic, Pacific and Arctic Oceans. Overall, the glaciers of the Canadian Rockies lost 25 percent of their mass during the 20th century.

Climate 

Under the Köppen climate classification, the park has a subarctic climate (Dfc) with cold, snowy winters, and mild summers. The climate is influenced by altitude with lower temperatures generally found at higher elevations. Located on the eastern side of the Continental Divide, Banff National Park receives  of precipitation annually. Being influenced by altitude, snowfall is also greater at higher elevations. As such,  of snow falls on average each year in the Banff townsite, while  falls in Lake Louise, which is located at a higher altitude.

During winter months, temperatures in Banff are moderated, compared to other areas of central and northern Alberta, due to Chinook winds and other influences from British Columbia. However, temperatures can drop below  with wind chill values dropping below . Weather conditions during summer months are warm, with high temperatures during July averaging , and daily low temperatures averaging , leading to a large diurnal range owing to the relative dryness of the air.

Ecology

Ecoregions 

Banff National Park spans three ecoregions, including montane, subalpine, and alpine. The subalpine ecoregion, which consists mainly of dense forest, comprises 53 percent of Banff's area. 27 percent of the park is located above the tree line, in the alpine ecoregion. A small portion (3 percent) of the park, located at lower elevations, is in the montane ecoregion. Lodgepole pine forests dominate the montane region of Banff, with Engelmann spruce, willow, aspen, occasional Douglas-fir and a few Douglas maple interspersed. Engelmann spruce are more common in the subalpine regions of Banff, with some areas of lodgepole pine, and subalpine fir. The montane areas in the Bow Valley, which tend to be the preferred habitat for wildlife, have been subjected to significant human development over the years.

Wildlife 

The park has 56 recorded mammal species. Grizzly bears and black bears inhabit the forested regions. Cougar, lynx, wolverine, red fox, weasel, river otter, coyote, and timber wolf are the primary predatory mammals. Elk, mule deer, and white-tailed deer are common in the valleys of the park, including around (and sometimes in) the Banff townsite, while moose tend to be more elusive, sticking primarily to wetland areas and near streams. In the alpine regions, mountain goat, bighorn sheep, marmot and pika are widespread. Other mammals such as beaver, porcupine, squirrel, chipmunk, snowshoe hare, and Columbian ground squirrel are the more commonly observed smaller mammals. Caribou were the rarest large mammals in the park, but an avalanche in 2009 may have killed the last five remaining within park boundaries. The American bison was extirpated in Banff, but was brought back to the park in 2017, and one free-roaming herd lives within the protected area.

Due to the harsh winters, the park has few reptile and amphibian species with only one species of toad, three species of frog, one salamander species and two species of snakes that have been identified. At least 280 species of birds can be found in Banff including bald and golden eagles, red-tailed hawk, osprey, and merlin, all of which are predatory species. Additionally, commonly seen species such as the Canada jay, American three-toed woodpecker, mountain bluebird, Clark's nutcracker, mountain chickadee and pipit are frequently found in the lower elevations. The white-tailed ptarmigan is a ground bird that is often seen in the alpine zones. Rivers and lakes are frequented by over a hundred different species including loon, heron and mallard which spend their summers in the park.

Endangered species in Banff include the Banff Springs snail (Physella johnsoni) that is found in the hot springs of Banff, and the Woodland caribou.

Mountain pine beetles 

Mountain pine beetles have caused a number of large-scale infestations in Banff National Park, feeding on the phloem of mature lodgepole pines. Alberta's first known outbreak occurred in 1940, infecting  of forest in Banff. A second major outbreak occurred in the late 1970s and early 1980s in Banff and the surrounding Rocky Mountains region.

Tourism 

Banff National Park is the most visited Alberta tourist destination and one of the most visited national parks in North America, with more than three million tourists annually. Tourism in Banff contributes an estimated  billion annually to the economy.

A park pass is required for stopping in the park, and permit checks are common during the summer months, especially at Lake Louise and the start of the Icefields Parkway. A permit is not required if travelling straight through the park without stopping. Approximately 5 million people pass through Banff annually on the Trans-Canada Highway without stopping.

In 2009, Banff Lake Louise Tourism hoped the appearance of the "Crasher Squirrel" internet meme would stimulate interest in the park. The meme is based on a photograph of a Minnesotan couple visiting the park on the shore of Lake Minnewanka that was "crashed" by a Columbian ground squirrel; the photograph was published in major news sources around the world and the image of the squirrel was digitally manipulated into humorous photos.

General management 

Banff National Park is managed by Parks Canada, under the National Parks Act which was passed in 1930. Over time, park management policies have increasingly emphasized environmental protection over development. In 1964, a policy statement was issued that reiterated ideals of conservation laid out in the 1930 act. With the controversial bid for the 1972 Winter Olympics, environmental groups became more influential, leading Parks Canada to withdraw its support for the bid. The 1979 Beaver Book was a major new policy, which emphasized conservation. In 1988, the National Parks Act was amended, making the maintenance of ecological integrity the top priority. The amendment also paved the way for non-governmental organizations to challenge Parks Canada in court, for breaches in adhering to the Act. In 1994, Parks Canada established revised "Guiding Principles and Operating Policies", which included a mandate for the Banff-Bow Valley Study to draft management recommendations. As with other national parks, Banff is required to have a Park Management Plan. On a provincial level, the park area and the included communities (other than the town of Banff which is an incorporated municipality) are administered by Alberta Municipal Affairs as Improvement District No. 9 (Banff).

Wildlife management

Previous management 
The park was originally considered as a recreational area for visitors offering multiple leisure activities – the original wildlife policy viewed wildlife in Banff only as game or pests up until the 1960s and 1970s. As ecological awareness increased, management procedures expanded with the inclusion of public participation in many management decisions. Simultaneously, the increase in human construction (such as new highways) on the natural landscape increased the frequency of human–animal conflicts. In 1988 wildlife began to be considered an integral part of the ecosystem.

The park now has a number of wildlife management strategies that aim to conserve certain species. Parks Canada uses an ecosystem based management approach that aims to preserve the ecology of the park while still providing for visitors. Management decisions are based on modern scientific ecological information as well as traditional knowledge.

Large species management 

Elk are a very important species in Banff National Park, partly because they represent a source of food for declining wolves. However they also have harsh impacts on the environment. Large elk populations cause vegetation degradation, human–animal conflicts and destabilization of biological interactions. In 1999, the implementation of the Banff National Park Elk Management Strategy by Parks Canada and the Elk Advisory Committee aimed to monitor and control the population to decrease conflicts and aid ecological process recovery.

Elk handling facilities are areas of pens with loading and unloading ramps where water and food are provided to the elk. They were created to help reduce herd numbers by increasing wariness and encouraging migratory behaviour, deterring the elk from the town of Banff. These measures allowed more predator–prey interactions thanks to the creation of corridors. They also increased elk migration, restored the willow and aspen communities and highlighted the primary role of wolves in elk population management.

The state of grizzly bear populations in Banff is seen as a proxy for ecological integrity. To keep bears away from humans, an electric fence was put up around the summer gondola and parking lot at Lake Louise in 2001. Bear-proof garbage cans, which do not allow bears to access their contents, help to deter them from human sites. The fruit of Buffaloberry bushes is eaten by bears, so the bushes have been removed in some areas where the risk of a bear–human encounter is high.

Aversive conditioning deters bears by modifying their behaviour. Deterrents such as noise makers and rubber bullets are used each time the bear performs an undesirable action. Advice is also given to people to avoid an eventual habituation of bears to human presence. If this conditioning is continual the bear will be less likely to continue the undesirable behaviour (crossing into campsites and roads etc.).

Southern mountain caribou management previously aimed to identify what was threatening caribou populations and find solutions to mitigate the threats, but the last caribou in the park was found dead in an avalanche in 2009. There was concern over why more had not been done to save the caribou population. The primary reason for their decline is thought to have been habitat loss and altered predator–prey dynamics. Park management began monitoring the last five caribou in the park in 2002 and taking actions such as reducing impacts of humans, conducting studies of the population, and investigating the possibility of translocating caribou to increase the Banff population. 

In the mid-1980s gray wolves recolonized the Bow Valley in Banff National Park. They had been absent for 30 years due to systematic predator control hunting which began in 1850. Wolves filtered back to Banff and recolonized one zone of the Bow Valley in 1985 and another in 1991. A high level of human use surrounding a third zone at Banff townsite has deterred the wolves from that area. The wolves are important in controlling elk populations and improve the balance of the ecosystem. A routine park study to monitor the wolves in Banff has now grown into the Southern Rockies Canine Project – the largest wolf research project in North America. The estimated wolf population in Banff National Park and the surrounding areas is now 60–70 animals.

Plains bisons were reintroduced to Banff in 2017. The park has an extensive system of grasslands in backcountry valleys that are perfect for the bison. 16 bison were translocated from Elk Island National Park and  initially placed under observation for a year in an enclosed pasture within a  reintroduction site near Panther River Valley. After 18 months of acclimation, the herd was released into the reintroduction site and as of August 2021, the herd had grown to 66.

Strategies 
Wildlife crossings have been successful in Banff National Park at reducing the number of animals killed on the roads. There is also  of fencing at the edge of the highway in the park to prevent animals from getting onto the roads. Since it was put up, this has reduced collisions between wildlife and vehicles by over 80 per cent.

Train tracks still pose challenges to conservationists. Many bears have been killed by trains, often because they are attracted to grain spills along the tracks. Transportation corridors provide openings for plants which are also utilised by bears.  A partnership between Parks Canada and Canadian Pacific Railway allowed the creation of the first Railway-Bear Conflict Mitigation Symposium in 2010. Initiatives included building wooden pegboards to fence off the sides of tracks and chemically treating grains to deter the bears. After a complete review of the research projects, the development of some of them has been authorized, including grain alteration and the use of cameras to study the behavioural response of bears to trains.

In 2011, Parks Canada began to study the effectiveness of electro-mats, large mats that give a small electric shock to animals that step on them, as a potential deterrent around train tracks. A trial installment of the mats was placed in Banff to test their effectiveness in deterring animals like bears from gaining access to the fenced train tracks inside the park.

General prohibitions implemented to ensure wildlife respect include the prohibition of feeding, touching, or holding animals in captivity, and the disturbance or destruction of bird nests.

Human impact

Environment 
Since the 19th century, humans have impacted Banff's environment through introduction of non-native species, controls on other species, and development in the Bow Valley, among other human activities. Bison once lived in the valleys of Banff and were hunted by indigenous people, but the last bison were killed off in 1850s. In 2017 a small herd of sixteen plains Bison were reintroduced into an eastern section of the park. Elk are not indigenous to Banff, and were introduced in 1917 with 57 elk brought in from Yellowstone National Park. The introduction of elk to Banff, combined with controls on coyote and wolves by Parks Canada beginning in the 1930s, has caused imbalance of the ecosystem. Other species that have been displaced from the Bow Valley include grizzly bears, cougars, lynx, wolverine, otter, and moose. Beginning in 1985, gray wolves were recolonizing areas in the Bow Valley. However, the wolf population has struggled, with 32 wolf deaths along the Trans-Canada Highway between 1987 and 2000, leaving only 31 wolves in the area.

The population of bull trout and other native species of fish in Banff's lakes has also dwindled, with the introduction of non-native species including brook trout, and rainbow trout. Lake trout, westslope cutthroat trout, and Chiselmouth are rare native species, while chinook salmon, White sturgeon, Pacific lamprey, and Banff longnose dace are likely extirpated locally. The Banff longnose dace, once only found in Banff, is now an extinct species.

The Trans-Canada Highway, passing through Banff, has been problematic, posing hazards for wildlife due to vehicle traffic and as an impediment to wildlife migration. Grizzly bears are among the species impacted by the highway, which together with other developments in Banff, has caused fragmentation of the landscape. Grizzly bears prefer the montane habitat, which has been most impacted by development. Wildlife crossings, including a series of underpasses, and six wildlife overpasses, have been constructed at a number of points along the Trans-Canada Highway to help alleviate this problem.

Fire management 
Parks Canada management practices, notably fire suppression, since Banff National Park was established have impacted the park's ecosystem. Since 1983, Parks Canada has adopted a strategy that employed prescribed burns, which helps to mimic effects of natural fires.

Transportation 
Banff National Park is bisected by two highways that cross the Alberta/British Columbia border while another provides a third access within Alberta.  The Trans-Canada Highway (Highway 1) bisects the park in an east–west direction, connecting it to Vancouver to the west and Calgary to the east. Highway 93 bisects the park in a north–south direction, connecting it to Cranbrook to the south and Jasper to the north. The portion of Highway 93 north of Lake Louise is known as the Icefields Parkway whereas the portion southwest of Castle Junction is known as the Banff-Windermere Parkway. Highway 11 (the David Thompson Highway) connects the Icefields Parkway at Saskatchewan River Crossing to Rocky Mountain House to the northeast. Within the park, Highway 1A, also known as the Bow Valley Parkway, loosely parallels Highway 1 between Banff and Lake Louise.

The closest airport with long-haul flights is Calgary International Airport (YYC).

Other transportation facilities within Banff National Park include a Canadian Pacific rail line that generally parallels Highway 1 and an airport known as the Banff Park Compound Heliport.

Development 

In 1978, expansion of Sunshine Village ski resort was approved, with added parking, hotel expansion, and development of Goat's Eye Mountain. Implementation of this development proposal was delayed through the 1980s, while environmental assessments were conducted. In 1989, Sunshine Village withdrew its development proposal, in light of government reservations, and submitted a revised proposal in 1992. This plan was approved by the government, pending environmental review. Subsequently, the Canadian Parks and Wilderness Society (CPAWS) filed a court injunction, which halted the development. CPAWS also put pressure on UNESCO to revoke Banff's World Heritage Site status, over concerns that developments were harming the park's ecological health.

Banff-Bow Valley Study 

While the National Parks Act and the 1988 amendment emphasize ecological integrity, in practice Banff has suffered from inconsistent application of the policies. In 1994, the Banff-Bow Valley Study was mandated by Sheila Copps, the minister responsible for Parks Canada, to provide recommendations on how to better manage human use and development, and maintain ecological integrity. While the two-year Banff-Bow Valley Study was underway, development projects were halted, including the expansion of Sunshine Village, and the twinning of the Trans-Canada Highway between Castle Junction and Sunshine.

The panel issued over 500 recommendations, including limiting the growth of the Banff townsite, capping the town's population at 10,000, placing quotas for popular hiking trails, and curtailing development in the park. Another recommendation was to fence off the townsite to reduce confrontations between people and elk. The proposed fencing was also intended to reduce access to this refuge for elk from predators, such as wolves that tended to avoid the townsite. Upon release of the report, Copps immediately moved to accept the proposal to cap the town population. She also ordered a small airstrip to be removed, along with a buffalo paddock, and cadet camp, that inhibited wildlife movement.

In response to concerns and recommendations raised by the Banff-Bow Valley Study, a number of development plans were curtailed in the 1990s. Plans to add nine holes at the Banff Springs Golf Resort were withdrawn in 1996.

Canmore 
With the cap on growth in the town of Banff, Canmore, located just outside the Banff boundary, has been growing rapidly to serve increasing demands of tourists. Major development proposals for Canmore have included the Three Sisters Golf Resorts, proposed in 1992, which has been the subject of contentious debate, with environmental groups arguing that the development would fragment important wildlife corridors in the Bow Valley.

See also 

 Bears and Man, a documentary on bear problems in the park
 List of national parks of Canada
 List of historic places in Alberta's Rockies
 List of mountains in Alberta
 List of trails in Alberta
 List of waterfalls of Alberta

References

External links 

 
National parks of the Rocky Mountains
Canadian Rockies
1885 establishments in Canada
Protected areas established in 1885
History of the Rocky Mountains
Bison herds